John Brockman may refer to:

John Brockman (literary agent) (born 1941), American author and literary agent
John Brockman (soldier) (1734–1801), colonel from North Carolina in the American Revolutionary War
Jon Brockman (born 1987), American basketball player